Grzegorz Bronowicki (born 4 August 1980, in Jaszczów) is a Polish football defender who currently plays for Błękit Cyców.

Career
Bronowicki spent most of his early career at Górnik Łęczna, apart from one season which he spent at Lewart Lubartów. He attracted interest from many French clubs during the 2006–07 season, impressing for both Legia Warszawa and the Poland national team, including Poland's 2-1 win over Portugal where he was named man of the match. He was named in the provisional squad for Euro 2008 with the hope that he would recover from a knee injury in time for the tournament. However, he was ultimately removed from the squad after coach Leo Beenhakker determined that his return to fitness would take longer than expected. He signed with Red Star Belgrade in the Serbian SuperLiga however due to his persistent injury problems he had inconsistent exhibitions. Playing as left-back, in his first season in Serbia he managed to play 13 league matches, but in 2008-09 he ended up not playing any league match.

At the end of his contract in summer 2009 he returned to Górnik Łęczna where he will progressively recovered, and subsequently, in summer 2010, he signed with Ruch Chorzów returning to Ekstraklasa, the top Polish division. He was released from Ruch in May 2011.

Family
His brother, Piotr Bronowicki is also a footballer.

Honours
Legia Warsaw
Ekstraklasa: 2005–06

References

External links
 
 

1980 births
Living people
Polish footballers
Poland international footballers
Polish expatriate footballers
Association football defenders
Górnik Łęczna players
Legia Warsaw players
Red Star Belgrade footballers
Ruch Chorzów players
JKS 1909 Jarosław players
Ekstraklasa players
Serbian SuperLiga players
Expatriate footballers in Serbia
People from Łęczna County
Sportspeople from Lublin Voivodeship